Gualosuchus is an extinct genus of proterochampsian archosauriform from the Middle Triassic Chañares Formation of Argentina. The type and only species is Gualosuchus reigi, named by paleontologist Alfred Romer in 1971.

References 

Proterochampsians
Middle Triassic reptiles of South America
Triassic Argentina
Fossils of Argentina
Chañares Formation
Fossil taxa described in 1971
Taxa named by Alfred Romer
Prehistoric reptile genera